Kleiner Winterberg  is a hill in Saxon Switzerland.

Mountains of Saxon Switzerland
Elbe Sandstone Mountains
Hills of Saxony